Chang Guitian (1942 – 30 November 2018) was a Chinese xiangsheng comedian of Manchu ethnicity. He was a first-level national actor. He attained the rank of major general (shaojiang) on December 22, 2012. His disciples included Li Zhiyou, Zhu Haitang, Zhang Yong, and Zhang Lingqi.

Biography
Chang was born into a family of xiangsheng performers in 1942. His grandfather Chang Lian'an (1899–1966) was a xiangsheng master in the first half of the 20th century. His father Chang Baokun (1922–1951) was a xiangsheng performer who died in the Korean War. His uncle Chang Baohua (1930–2018) was one of the sixth generation of well-known xiangsheng performers.

In 1954 he began to learn xiangsheng under Zhao Peiru (1914–1973). Four years later, he joined the Song and Dance Ensemble of the Political Department of People's Liberation Army Navy. Chang was promoted to the rank of major general (shaojiang) on December 22, 2012.

On November 30, 2018, he died of illness in Beijing, aged 76.

References

1942 births
2018 deaths
Male actors from Beijing
Manchu people
Manchu male actors
Chinese xiangsheng performers
Chinese male stage actors
Chinese male comedians